Plectrocarpa is a genus of flowering plants belonging to the family Zygophyllaceae.

Its native range is Colombia to Venezuela, Bolivia to Western Central Brazil and Northern Argentina.

Species:

Plectrocarpa arborea 
Plectrocarpa bonariensis 
Plectrocarpa carrapo 
Plectrocarpa rougesii 
Plectrocarpa sarmientoi 
Plectrocarpa tetracantha

References

Zygophyllaceae
Rosid genera